The 2018 FIFA U-20 Women's World Cup Final was the final match of the 2018 FIFA U-20 Women's World Cup in France. The match was played at the Stade de la Rabine, located in Vannes, on 24 August 2018 and was contested by Spain and Japan. The same national teams faced each other the posterior edition of the tournament. In both cases, the match resulted on a 3–1 scoreline, being the 2018 scoreline of the clash in Japan's favour.  Beating Spain in the Final granted Japan's their first FIFA U-20 Women's World Cup title, turning them into only the second Asian national team to ever win the trophy, after North Korea won it on 2006 and 2016. With North Korea's triumph on 2016, Japan's win turned out to be the only time where back-to-back trophies were handed to national teams of the same confederation (AFC).

Road to the final

Match

Details

References

Japan women's national football team matches